Boronia rupicola is a species of plant in the citrus family Rutaceae and is endemic to a small area in the Northern Territory, Australia. It is a small shrub with weeping branches, simple or pinnate leaves and small, green, inconspicuous flowers.

Description
Its branches are brittle and more or less square in cross-section. The leaves are arranged in opposite pairs and there are both simple and pinnate leaves that are much paler on the lower surface.

Taxonomy and naming
Boronia rupicola was first formally described in 1997 by Marco F. Duretto who published the description in the journal Nuytsia. The specific epithet (rupicola) is said to be derived form Latin rupestris, meaning "rocky" and incola, meaning, "inhabitant", referring to the specialised habitat of this species.

Distribution and habitat
This boronia grows exclusively on vertical rock faces and is only known from Mount Brockman in Kakadu National Park and south of Nabarlek in Arnhem Land.

Conservation status
This species is listed as "near threatened" under the Territory Parks and Wildlife Conservation Act 2000.

References 

rupicola
Flora of the Northern Territory
Plants described in 1997
Taxa named by Marco Duretto